Hans Schwarz may refer to:

 Hans Schwarz (sculptor) (1492-ca.1532), German medallist and sculptor
 Hans Schwarz (swimmer) (1912-1996), German swimmer
 Hanns Schwarz (1888–1945), Austrian film director
 Hans Schwarz (theologian) (born 1939), German Lutheran theologian
 Hans Schwartz (1913–1991), German footballer
 Hans Schwarz (artist) (1922–2003), Austrian artist
 Hans Schwarz (athlete) (born 1924), Swiss Olympic hurdler